Gerhard Wagner may refer to:

 Gerhard Maria Wagner (born 1954), Austrian priest, gave up appointment as auxiliary bishop of Linz
 Gerhard Wagner (admiral) (1898–1987), naval officer
 Gerhard Wagner (physician) (1888–1939), leader of the Reich Physicians' Chamber
 Gerhard Wagner (physicist), German-American physicist